Alicia Zureen Dean (born 9 December 1987) is a Fijian cricketer who plays as a wicket-keeper and left-handed batter. She plays for Fiji and previously played for South Australia in Australian domestic cricket between 2005 and 2014. Dean's family migrated to Australia following the 1987 Fijian coups d'état, when she was one year old, before returning in 2010 to play for the national cricket team. She made her  international debut on 2 February 2010. She captained the side at the 2019 Pacific Games held in Samoa, scoring 122 runs and taking seven wickets as the team finished fourth without winning a match.

References

External links

1987 births
Fiji women Twenty20 International cricketers
Living people
South Australian Scorpions cricketers
Sportspeople from Suva
Fijian women cricketers